Patrick "Pat" Tunney (1 February 1872 – 28 November 1949) was an Irish born, English professional rugby league footballer who played in the 1900s. He played at representative level for England, and at club level for Salford, as a Forward (prior to the specialist positions of), during the era of contested scrums.

Playing career

International honours
Pat Tunney won a cap for England, he played as a forward, i.e. number 9, in the 3-9 defeat by Other Nationalities at Central Park, Wigan on Tuesday 5 April 1904, in the first ever international rugby league match.

Tunney won 18 caps playing for Lancashire.

Challenge Cup Final appearances
Pat Tunney played as a forward, i.e. number 10, in Salford's 8-16 defeat by Swinton in the 1900 Challenge Cup Final during the 1899–1900 season at Fallowfield Stadium, Manchester, in front of a crowd of 17,864.  He then played as Hooker in the 1902 Challenge cup final 0-25 defeat versus Broughton Rangers at Rochdale in front of a crowd of 15,006.  He suffered his third defeat in 1903, playing at Prop Forward against Halifax at Headingley in front of 32,507 spectators, Halifax winning 7-0.

References

1872 births
1949 deaths
England national rugby league team players
Irish rugby league players
Lancashire rugby league team players
Place of birth missing
Place of death missing
Rugby league forwards
Rugby league players from County Mayo
Salford Red Devils players